Rettet die Weihnachtsgans (English: Save the Christmas Goose) is a 2006 German family television film. It was first broadcast on 12 December 2006.

Cast
Markus Krojer as  Rudi Wasmeier
Leslie-Vanessa Lill as  Sophia Helfer
Christian Tramitz as Heinrich Helfer
Katharina Müller-Elmau as  Monika Helfer
Gesine Cukrowski as  Nina
Götz Otto as Alfred
Franziska Schlattner as Hanna Wasmeier
August Schmölzer as  Xaver Wasmeier
Monika Baumgartner as Käthe
Kevin Iannotta as Peter
Norbert Heckner
Alexander Onken
Martin Walch
Hans-Jürgen Stockerl

External links

2006 films
German children's films
German television films
German Christmas films
Films set in Bavaria
2000s German-language films
German-language television shows
Christmas television films
Sat.1 original programming